The Damara tern (Sternula balaenarum) is a species of small tern in the family Laridae which breeds in the southern summer in southern Africa and migrates to tropical African coasts to winter.

Description
At  in length the Damara tern is a small, rather pale tern. In breeding plumage adult has black cap extending from forehead the onto nape and a very pale grey back. In flight, there is a black triangular wing tip which runs from the carpal joint to the tip. In non-breeding plumage the adult shows white on the forehead and crown, with black mask going through the eyes and meeting on the nape. Immature birds are marked with buff bars across the mantle.

Voice
The calls of the Damara tern are a high-pitched, sharp "tsit tsit" and quick, harsh "kid-ick".:

Distribution and habitat
It breeds in western coastal Southern Africa from the Eastern Cape through the Western Cape and Northern Cape into Namibia and Angola; 98% of the population of 14,000 individuals nests in Namibia. Non-breeding birds migrate north reaching Benin, Cameroon, Republic of the Congo, Democratic Republic of the Congo, Ivory Coast, Gabon, Ghana, Liberia, Nigeria, and Togo.

The Damara tern generally prefers shorelines in arid, desert regions particularly where there are sheltered bays, estuaries, lagoons and reefs. For breeding it uses gravel plains between dunes and on salt pans.

Habits
The Damara tern eats mainly small fish, with the occasional squid, which are caught in repeated plunge dives from a height of 3-8m. Their migration is timed to coincide with spawning shoals of small fish in the shallow coastal waters of the Gulf of Guinea caused by strong upwellings of the coast of Ghana. These wintering birds roost communally but feed solitarily, spacing themselves at 10-50m from other Damara terns.

Eggs are laid in a plain scrape in the substrate which is sometimes lined with shell chips or small stones. The clutch normally consists of one, occasionally two eggs with an incubation period of 18–22 days.  For the first few days the female broods the chicks and the food is provided by the male then the chicks leave the scrape at a few days old and move towards the shore, they fledge after 20 days forming juvenile flocks. The juveniles are dependent on the adults for two and half months after they fledge.

Taxonomy
This species was previously included in the genus Sterna but with other small terns such as the little tern and the least tern it is now considered to be within the genus Sternula.

References

External links
 Species text in The Atlas of Southern African Birds.

Damara tern
Birds of Southern Africa
Birds of West Africa
Damara tern
Taxonomy articles created by Polbot